The following is a list of the first black or mixed-race players to represent European international association football teams. The first black man to play international football was Andrew Watson, who earned the first of his three caps for Scotland on 12 March 1881, when he captained them in a 6–1 win away to England at The Oval in London.

See also
List of first black Major League Baseball players by team

References

Association football-related lists
Lists of black people